Virginia Tracy (1874–March 4, 1946) was an American adventurer, stage actress, novelist and screenwriter. In the newspaper world she wrote primarily for the New York Tribune.

Biography 
She was the daughter of Victorian actress Helen Tracy (1850–1924). and Shakespearean actor John McCullough.

At 20, in 1894, she wrote one of her first professional reports after accompanying a caravan of actors led by Maurice Barrymore traveling cross country on train. In the 1920s she wrote several large scale epics for the Fox Film Corporation.

Tracy's Broadway credits as an actress included Escape This Night (1938), Sweet Mystery of Life (1935), Post Road (1934), Jigsaw (1934), And Be My Love, (1934), Lone Valley (1933), Bulls, Bears and Asses (1932), Wild Waves (1932), and Up York State (1901).

On March 4, 1946, Tracy died in New York City. She apparently had never married.

Works
Merely Players: The Stories of Stage Life (1909)
Persons Unknown (1914)
Starring Dulcy Jayne (1927)
Moment After (1930)
The Personal Appearance of a Lioness (1937)

Filmography
The Queen of Sheba (1921)
Nero (1922)
The Shepherd King (1923)
The Net (1924)

References

External links
Virginia Tracy at IMDb.com
portrait of Virginia Tracy(Wayback)
portrait head shot(Wayback)

1874 births
1946 deaths
Screenwriters from New York (state)
Actresses from New York City
Novelists from New York (state)
American women novelists
American women screenwriters
Writers from New York City
20th-century American actresses
20th-century American women writers
20th-century American novelists
20th-century American screenwriters